Flora June Plumb (October 14, 1944 – July 8, 2018) was an American television and film actress.

Plumb was born in Los Angeles, the daughter of Neeley and Flora Plumb. As a student at Birmingham High School, she acted in school plays and won the Best Actress and Best Thespian awards. She studied drama at UCLA, and in 1966 she received the Beulah Bondi Drama Scholarship.

She made her TV debut in The Wild Wild West in 1969, in a bit part. She went on to feature appearances in several TV series, including Marcus Welby, M.D., The F.B.I., The Mod Squad, Lovers and Friends (a spinoff of the soap opera Another World), Lou Grant, Dusty's Trail, and Quincy, M.E.. She also appeared in the 1978 film Malibu Beach. More recently, she provided the voice of Oska for Guild Wars 2 and appeared in the 2010 short film Death Panel.

In March 1994, Plumb directed and designed sets for a production of The Homage That Follows at Theatre 40 in Los Angeles.

For a quarter-century, she taught classes in directing and acting at Los Angeles County High School for the Arts.

Personal life and death
In 1984, Plumb married Richard Johnson. Flora Plumb died of cancer on July 8, 2018, aged 73.

Notes

External links 
 

1944 births
2018 deaths
Actresses from Greater Los Angeles
20th-century American actresses
21st-century American actresses
Actresses from Los Angeles
American film actresses
American television actresses
Deaths from cancer in California